Miller Hall, on the campus of Chadron State College in Chadron, Nebraska, was built in 1920 and was listed on the National Register of Historic Places in 1983.

It was designed by architect James C. Stitt.  It was the first gymnasium building in western Nebraska.

It now provides academic offices, classrooms and IT for Chadron State College.

References

External links

University and college buildings on the National Register of Historic Places in Nebraska
Buildings and structures completed in 1920
National Register of Historic Places in Dawes County, Nebraska
Chadron State College